Richard Kule Mbombo (born 10 May 1996) is a Congolese footballer currently playing as a forward for Indian Super League club NorthEast United.

Career
On 21 January 2020, Mbombo signed for Riga FC.

FK Sūduva 
In 2021 Riga FC loaned player to Lithuanian FK Sūduva

On March 19, 2021 Kule Mbombo scored his first goal in A lyga.

In the end of June 2021 player return to Latvia. In 2021 A lyga season he played 17 matches and scored 8 goals. Also he scored one goal in LFF Cup tournament.

NorthEast United
In January 2023, Mbombo joined Indian Super League club NorthEast United.

Career statistics

Honours

Club
FK Sūduva Marijampolė

 Alyga

Kaisar
Kazakhstan Cup (1): 2019

References

1996 births
Living people
Footballers from Kinshasa
Democratic Republic of the Congo footballers
Democratic Republic of the Congo expatriate footballers
Association football forwards
AS Vita Club players
K Beerschot VA players
AS Trenčín players
FC Kaisar players
Riga FC players
Dibba Al-Hisn Sports Club players
NorthEast United FC players
Challenger Pro League players
Slovak Super Liga players
Kazakhstan Premier League players
Latvian Higher League players
UAE First Division League players
Democratic Republic of the Congo expatriate sportspeople in Belgium
Expatriate footballers in Belgium
Democratic Republic of the Congo expatriate sportspeople in Slovakia
Expatriate footballers in Slovakia
Democratic Republic of the Congo expatriate sportspeople in Kazakhstan
Expatriate footballers in Kazakhstan
Democratic Republic of the Congo expatriate sportspeople in Latvia
Expatriate footballers in Latvia
Expatriate footballers in the United Arab Emirates
Democratic Republic of the Congo expatriate sportspeople in the United Arab Emirates
Expatriate footballers in India
Democratic Republic of the Congo expatriate sportspeople in India
21st-century Democratic Republic of the Congo people